Eduardo Alanis Nevares (born February 19, 1954) is an American prelate of the Roman Catholic church.  He has been serving as an auxiliary bishop of the Diocese of Phoenix in Arizona since 2010.

Biography

Early life and education
Nevares was born on February 19, 1954, in San Antonio, Texas, to Andres Valdes Nevares and Beatriz Alanis Tamez. The youngest of six children in a Mexican-American family, he has one sister and four brothers, all of whom were born in Mexico. The family lived in Chicago, Illinois, before settling in Houston. Eduardo Nevares received his early education at the parochial school of Immaculate Heart of Mary Parish in Houston. At age 14, he enrolled at La Salette Minor Seminary in Jefferson City, Missouri. The following year, when the seminary  closed, he transferred to St. Henry Preparatory Seminary in Belleville, Illinois.

Nevares continued his studies at La Salette Junior College Seminary in Altamont, New York, where he earned an Associate's degree in 1974. He attended the Missionary of Our Lady of La Salette Philosophy Seminary in Ipswich, Massachusetts, for one year before entering St. Thomas University in Houston.  Nevares earned a Bachelor of Philosophy degree there in 1976. Nevares entered the novitiate of the Missionaries of Our Lady of La Salette in 1976, professing his first vows in 1977 and his final vows in 1980. Nevares completed his theological studies at Kenrick Seminary in St. Louis, Missouri, where he earned a Master of Divinity degree in 1981.

Ordination and ministry
Nevares was ordained to the priesthood for the La Salette Missionaries by Bishop Bernard J. Ganter on July 18, 1981. His first assignment was as a parochial vicar at St. Patrick's Parish in Lufkin, Texas, where he remained for seven years. From 1988 to 1991, Nevares served as vocations director for the La Salette Missionaries. He then resumed his pastoral ministry, serving as a parochial vicar at Our Lady of Sorrows Parish in Jacksonville, Texas (1991) and as a chaplain at Stephen F. Austin State University in Nacogdoches, Texas (1991–93).

From 1993 to 2002, Nevares served as pastor of St. Patrick's Church in Lufkin. During his tenure at St. Patrick's, he oversaw the construction of a new church, which was completed and consecrated in 2001. In addition to his pastoral duties, Nevares served as provincial counselor to the St. Louis province of the La Salette Missionaries (1994–97). Nevares became co-director of vocations for holy orders and consecrated life in the Diocese of Tyler in 2002. In this capacity, he organized and conducted the first Spanish-speaking program for candidates for the permanent diaconate. He also served as diocesan director of charismatic groups.

After 25years as a La Salette Missionary, Nevares was incardinated into the Diocese of Tyler in 2007. In 2008, he was appointed vice-rector of the College of Liberal Arts at the Pontifical College Josephinum in Columbus, Ohio. As vice-rector, he has assisted with the administration of the priestly formation program, coordinated the formation for college level seminarians, and taught Spanish to the college seminarians.

Auxiliary Bishop of Phoenix
On May 11, 2010, Nevares was appointed as an auxiliary bishop of the Diocese of Phoenix and titular bishop of Natchesium by Pope Benedict XVI. Nevares is the first auxiliary bishop of and the first Hispanic bishop of the diocese. His episcopal motto is: "Serve the Lord with gladness."

Nevares received his episcopal consecration on July 19, 2010 from Bishop Thomas J. Olmsted at Saint Thomas Aquinas Catholic Church in Avondale, Arizona.

See also

 Catholic Church hierarchy
 Catholic Church in the United States
 Historical list of the Catholic bishops of the United States
 List of Catholic bishops of the United States
 Lists of patriarchs, archbishops, and bishops

References

External links 

 Roman Catholic Diocese of Phoenix
  "Bishop's Hour" radio program by Bishop Thomas Olmsted
 Diocesan Newspaper, The Catholic Sun
  Catholic Charities Community Services Arizona
 Parishes of the Diocese of Phoenix
  Department of Catholic Schools of the Diocese of Phoenix
 Other Catholic Organizations in the Diocese of Phoenix
 Arizona Catholic Conference

Episcopal succession

1954 births
Living people
American people of Mexican descent
People from San Antonio
Roman Catholic bishops in Arizona
Catholics from Texas
21st-century Roman Catholic bishops in the United States